Impressions is a live album by saxophonist Buck Hill which was recorded at the North Sea Jazz Festival in 1981 and released on the SteepleChase label.

Reception

The AllMusic review by Scott Yanow stated "This particular LP, recorded at the same Northsea Jazz Festival that had already resulted in Easy to Love, features Hill in 1981 leading a quartet ... The solos of Hill and Brown are excellent if not overly memorable, and the results are pleasing and swinging while being a little explorative in spots".

Track listing
 "Alone Together" (Arthur Schwartz, Howard Dietz) – 9:05
 "Penn Station" (Reuben Brown) – 10:50
 "Yesterdays" (Jerome Kern, Otto Harbach) – 11:58
 "Impressions" (John Coltrane) – 8:45
 "Spaces" (Brown) – 7:54 Additional track on CD release

Personnel
Buck Hill – tenor saxophone
Reuben Brown – piano 
Wilbur Little – bass 
Billy Hart – drums

References

SteepleChase Records live albums
Buck Hill (musician) live albums
1983 live albums